Nengren Temple may refer to:

 Nengren Temple (Jiujiang), in Jiujiang, Jiangxi, China
 Nengren Temple (Guangzhou), on Mount Baiyun, in Guangzhou, Guangdong, China
 Nengren Temple (Wenzhou), on Mount Yandang, in Wenzhou, Zhejiang, China
 Nengren Temple (Jiaxing), in Xiuzhou District of Jiaxing, Zhejiang, China
 Nengren Temple (Huai'an), in Lianshui County of Huai'an, Jiangsu, China
 Nengren Temple (Changzhou), in Xinbei District of Changzhou, Jiangsu, China
 Nengren Temple (Huaihua), in Chenxi County of Huaihua, Hunan, China
 Nengren Temple (Meishan), in Renshou County of Meishan, Sichuan, China
 Nengren Temple (Chongqing), in Yuzhong District of Chongqing, China
 Nengren Temple (Huanggang), on Mount Guifeng, in Huanggang, Hubei, China